was a Japanese Nihonga painter from Takatō, Nagano. He was a pupil of Seison Maeda.

Ezaki was also engaged in films as an art director and costume designer. He was nominated for the Academy Award for Best Costume Design for his work in Akira Kurosawa's film Seven Samurai (1954).

References

External links 

Japanese costume designers
1904 births
1963 deaths
People from Nagano Prefecture
20th-century Japanese painters